This is a list of Croatian television related events from 1994.

Events
20 March - Tony Cetinski is selected to represent Croatia at the 1994 Eurovision Song Contest with his song "Nek' ti bude ljubav sva". He is selected to be the second Croatian Eurovision entry during Dora held at the Crystal Ballroom of Hotel Kvarner in Opatija.

Debuts

Television shows

Ending this year

Births

Deaths